Aimee Carrero (born July 15, 1988) is a Dominican-American actress. She is known for voicing Princess Elena on Disney Channel's Elena of Avalor and Adora/She-Ra in the Netflix series She-Ra and the Princesses of Power. Her live action-roles include Sofia Rodriguez on the Freeform sitcom Young & Hungry and Angie on the Cartoon Network series Level Up.

Early life and education
Carrero was born in Santo Domingo, Dominican Republic to a Dominican mother and a Puerto Rican father and grew up in Miami, Florida. She is an alumna of Florida International University graduating in 2008 with a degree in international relations.

Career
In 2009, she appeared in the feature film Alvin and the Chipmunks: The Squeakquel. Carrero's television credits include The Mentalist, Lincoln Heights, Men of a Certain Age, The Middle, Greek, Zeke and Luther and Baby Daddy. In 2011, she was cast as Angie in the Cartoon Network live-action film Level Up. She reprised her role in the subsequent television series of the same name. The series ended in 2013 after two seasons.

In 2012, Carrero played in the Lifetime television film Blue Lagoon: The Awakening. That same year, she made her Off-Broadway debut in Atlantic Theater Company's world premiere play, What Rhymes with America in December 2012. In 2014, she co-starred in the horror film Devil's Due. Carrero also had a recurring role in the second season of the FX series The Americans as Lucia, a Sandinista freedom fighter. She was also cast in the ABC Family sitcom Young & Hungry, starring Emily Osment.

In January 2015, it was announced that Carrero will be providing the voice of Elena, Disney's first Latina fairy tale princess for the Disney Channel series Elena of Avalor. The series is a spin-off of the Disney Junior series Sofia the First, and it premiered on July 22, 2016. In April 2016, it was announced that Carrero and her character Sofia would be co-starring with Ashley Tisdale in a potential spinoff series of Young & Hungry, titled Young & Sofia. However, the project did not move past the backdoor pilot phase. 

In 2018, Carrero was cast as the voice of main character Adora in the Netflix animated series reboot She-Ra and the Princesses of Power. From June to August 2021, Carrero starred in the actual play limited series Exandria Unlimited, a spinoff of the web series Critical Role. In March 2022, she reprised her role in a two part special Exandria Unlimited: Kymal.

Carerro landed a recurring role as Danielle in the drama series Maid, inspired by Stephanie Land's memoir Maid: Hard Work, Low Pay, and a Mother's Will to Survive, that premiered on Netflix on October 1, 2021. Her character is a survivor of domestic abuse who becomes friends with Alex, Margaret Qualley's character, at the women's shelter. Fans and critics of the show praised Danielle as a "fiercely determined character" and "another young mom at the domestic violence shelter who quite literally gets Alex back on her feet" but noted that her story was never completed and the audience is left wondering what happened to her.

She appeared in supporting roles in Spirited and Mark Mylod's The Menu in 2022. 

On October 16, 2022, Carrero was given the Breakout Performance Award at the Newport Beach Film Festival.

Personal life
In November 2015, she became engaged to actor Tim Rock. They were married in August 2016.

Filmography

Film

Television

Web

Music video

Awards and nominations

References

External links

1988 births
Living people
Actresses from Miami
American film actresses
American stage actresses
American television actresses
American voice actresses
Dominican Republic emigrants to the United States
Florida International University alumni
Hispanic and Latino American actresses
21st-century American actresses